Lucía Rodríguez Montero (born 26 July 1998) is a Spanish athlete. She competed in the women's 3000 metres event at the 2021 European Athletics Indoor Championships.

Competition record

References

External links
 
 
 
 

1998 births
Living people
Spanish female middle-distance runners
Olympic athletes of Spain
Athletes (track and field) at the 2020 Summer Olympics
People from San Lorenzo de El Escorial
21st-century Spanish women